The 1877 Launceston by-election was fought on 3 March 1877.  The by-election was fought due to the resignation of the incumbent Conservative MP, James Henry Deakin (junior).  It was won by the Conservative candidate Sir Hardinge Stanley Giffard.

References

1877 in England
1877 elections in the United Kingdom
By-elections to the Parliament of the United Kingdom in Cornish constituencies
19th century in Cornwall
March 1877 events
Launceston, Cornwall